Awood Johnson Jr. (August 16, 1975March 1, 2013), better known by his stage name Magic (or Mr. Magic), was an American rapper from New Orleans, best known for his stint with No Limit Records in the late 1990s and early 2000s.

Early life 
Born and raised in the Lower Ninth Ward of New Orleans, Louisiana, Awood Johnson first made his name in New Orleans' underground circuit performing in talent shows and in a local group. Magic first appeared on C-Murder's songs "Picture Me" and "Watch Yo Enemies" on his 1998 album Life or Death. He was signed to C-Murder's label Tru Records, a sublabel to No Limit Records.

Career 
Magic's released his debut solo studio album, Sky's the Limit, in 1998, which reached #15 on the Billboard 200. In 1999, Magic released his second solo studio album Thuggin' which featured hit singles "That's Me" and "Ice on my Wrist" with Master P, which had minor success, peaking at #30. Following poor sales of his third studio album, White Eyes (#147), in 2003, along with the departure of many of No Limit's marquee artists and the label's overall decline, Magic severed his relationship with No Limit. He released his fourth and final solo album, the non-charting On My Own, on Koch Records, just five months after his split from No Limit.

Magic joined fellow New Orleans native Choppa and former boxing champion Roy Jones Jr. to form the group Body Head Bangerz, which released its only album in 2004, Body Head Bangerz: Volume One, and had a minor hit with "I Smoke, I Drank".

Magic then secured a deal with TVT Records in 2006, but left without ever releasing any material. He formed his own label, Banx Entertainment, in 2011.

Death 
On March 1, 2013, Johnson and his wife Chastity were killed in a traffic collision in Hattiesburg, Mississippi. Their 12-year-old daughter was the lone survivor.

Discography

Studio albums 
Sky's the Limit (1998)
Thuggin' (1999)
White Eyes (2003)
On My Own (2003)

Collaboration albums 
Body Head Bangerz: Volume One with Body Head Bangerz (2004)

References

External links 
Magic on Myspace
June 2011 interview – YouTube

1975 births
2013 deaths
African-American male rappers
No Limit Records artists
Rappers from New Orleans
Road incident deaths in Mississippi
Southern hip hop musicians
TVT Records artists
Gangsta rappers
20th-century African-American people
21st-century African-American people